Cakalang fufu is a cured and smoked skipjack tuna clipped on a bamboo frame, a Minahasan delicacy of North Sulawesi, Indonesia.

Process 
After the cakalang (Minahasan for skipjack tuna) fish has been cleaned (scaled and gutted), the flesh of cakalang is split into two parts and clipped upon a bamboo frame that has been prepared previously. Then the fish meat is cured using soda powder, salt and some spices for flavouring. The cakalang meat later undergoes the smoking process, the heat of fire and smoke must be evenly distributed so that all parts of fish are exposed to the heat, done and dried. The tuna meat curing process takes about four hours and the time needed for cooling is about two hours. The process goes on until the color of skipjack tuna turns reddish and the meat texture is rather dry and not watery.

If processed correctly, cakalang fufu could last for a month, thus can be distributed throughout Indonesia as processed seafood. In North Sulawesi, cakalang fufu is a popular dish and often bought by travellers as gifts. Although it is well known throughout Eastern Indonesia, the main production center more precisely is the fishing town of Bitung, North Sulawesi.

Cakalang fufu can be heated or fried and directly consumed with steamed rice accompanied with dabu-dabu (Minahasan sambal), or become the ingredient of other dishes, such as mixed with potato salad, sprinkled upon noodles or tinutuan, or cooked as spicy rica-rica with chili pepper. It has a  strong smoky flavor, thanks to being cooked over burning coconut husks.

Product distribution
Cakalang fufu products can be found in major cities across Indonesia. A common problem for local producers of cakalang fufu is raising the capital necessary to expand production. To solve this problem the Ministry of Industry (Indonesia) provides concessional loans (soft loans) through local governments. Local governments also participate in fairs and festivals to increase public awareness of cakalang fufu.

See also 

 Smoked fish
 Smoked salmon
 Kipper
 Bloater
 Buckling
 List of smoked foods
 List of tuna dishes

References

External links 
 Cakalang Fufu Potato Salad recipe (in Indonesian)
 Cakalang Fufu Noodle recipe (in Indonesian)
 Spicy Cakalang Fufu recipe (in Indonesian)

Smoked fish
Tuna dishes
Fish processing
Indonesian seafood dishes
Manado cuisine